Laverton railway station may refer to:

Laverton railway station, Melbourne in the Australian city of Melbourne
Laverton Halt railway station, in the English county of Gloucestershire